Hindle Wakes is a poultry dish supposedly associated with the Bolton area of England. Its origins are claimed to point to Flemish weavers in 16th century Lancashire.  The dish consists of a long-steamed capon or boiling fowl, enhanced with black, green and yellow colouring provided by a stuffing of pig's blood or prunes for the black, butter lemon sauce for the yellow and green for the garnish.  The dish is prepared by stuffing a fowl with a combination of breadcrumbs, lemon, pig's blood or prunes, then steaming for four hours prior to roasting for thirty minutes and covering in a lemon butter sauce and greenery.  

It is unclear whether this often-written-about dish is indeed ancient, or was invented, along with its supposed history, in the 1950s.

References
  pp. 24–26; p. 347

External links
 The story of Hindle Wakes at Foodsofengland.co.uk

English cuisine
Culture in Greater Manchester